Aswathy Thirunal Gowri Lakshmi Bayi (born 1945) of the Travancore Royal Family is an Indian writer from Kerala. She has ten books to her credit.

Aswathy Thirunal is the niece of the last King of Travancore, Chithira Thirunal Balarama Varma.

Birth and education
Aswathy Thirunal was born as the third child of Maharani Karthika Thirunal Lakshmi Bayi of Travancore Royal Family and Lt. Col G. V. Raja on 4 July 1945. Her siblings are Avittom Thirunal Rama Varma (1938-1944), Pooyam Thirunal Gowri Parvati Bayi (1941) and Moolam Thirunal Rama Varma (1949), the present scion of Travancore. She was educated at home by Anglo-Indian tutors along with her siblings. After finishing school, she joined Women's College Thiruvananthapuram to pursue a Degree in Economics and graduated from there in 1966.

Marriage
At the age of 18 in 1963, Aswathy Thirunal married 26-year-old Vishakham Nal Sukumaran Raja Raja Varma, a member of the Paliyakkara West Palace of Thiruvalla. The couple had two sons and an adopted daughter. Raja Raja Varma died on 30 December 2005 from injuries received in a car accident.

Literary works
Aswathi Thirunal has written several books on subjects such as Travancore temples and Kerala temple architecture as well as three collections of English poems, numerous articles in newspapers, and books on the culture and heritage of India — 13 books in total. Some of her important works are: The Dawn (1994), Kerala Temple Architecture: Some Notable Features (1997), Sree Padmanabha Swamy Temple (1998), Thulsi Garland (1998), The Mighty Indian Experience (2002), Budhadarśanaṃ: lēkhanaṅṅaḷ (2007), Glimpses of Kerala Culture (2011), Rudrakshamala (2014) and An Amateur's Attempt at Poetry (2018). According to critics, the book Sree Padmanabha Swamy Temple published in 1998, considered a comprehensive work on the ancient temple, is extremely popular and has run into several editions. The book was translated into Malayalam by K. Shankaran Nambuthiri and K. Jayakumar.Her latest book is History Liberated - The Sree Chithra Saga

References

External links

 Muralramayan prologue
 Onam Memories-(1)-Princess Aswathy Thirunal Youtube.com

Travancore royal family
1945 births
Living people
20th-century Indian women writers
20th-century Indian non-fiction writers
20th-century Indian novelists
Writers from Kerala
People from Thiruvananthapuram
Indian women travel writers
Indian travel writers
21st-century Indian women writers
21st-century Indian writers
21st-century Indian non-fiction writers
English-language writers from India
Malayalam novelists
Indian women novelists
Malayalam-language writers
21st-century Indian novelists
Women of the Kingdom of Travancore
People of the Kingdom of Travancore
Women writers from Kerala
20th-century Indian poets
Indian women poets
21st-century Indian poets
Poets from Kerala
Indian women screenwriters
Malayalam screenwriters
Screenwriters from Kerala
Indian women essayists
20th-century Indian essayists
21st-century Indian essayists